Green is the fifth studio album by Hiroshi Yoshimura, released in 1986 by Sona Gaia and re-issued in 2020 on Light in the Attic.

Background

After being released on vinyl in Japan, the album was released on CD in the United States with a different mix, adding additional ambient environmental noises such as rain and birds to market to the new age audience.

Track listing
All tracks written and produced by Hiroshi Yoshimura

References

1986 albums
Ambient albums